Margarita Brender Rubira (1919-2000) was a Romanian-born architect, the first woman architect in Catalonia.

Life
Margarita Brender Rubira was born in 1919 in Romania, and studied architecture in Romania.

In a 6 November 1962 interview to La Prensa (a Barcelona newspaper), she stated that "architects have a great responsibility for the influence that their works exert on people's lives, as it is up to you to make or not make houses that are real shelters, real resting places, that contribute to the nation's physical health and morale".

Beginning in 1966, Brender was one of a team of three architects working on a modern 346-apartment complex to replace a fabric factory in the Can Mercader region of Badalona. According to a review of the project in 2018, "Can Mercader is an example taken from the context of functionalist architecture, almost in a tropical style in which green breaks through the concrete."

Her solo designs were included in annual summaries published by the architecture journal Cuaderns in 1969 and 1970. The 1969 issue featured a page about an apartment block on the Costa Brava. According to the COAC, "The hand-drawn layout and perspective display a deft handling of modules that gives the whole complex an organic appearance, a direct legacy of the Can Mercader district." The 1970 issue included a page about Brender's design for luxury apartments in Prat de Llobregat.

According to an article about her published in 2017 by the Republican Youth of Catalonia (JERC),

She defended an avant-garde style of architecture, where the design of the spaces has a qualitative impact on improving the lives of the people who inhabit it. Throughout her career she gave great importance to the integration between architecture and nature. She believed that every room should be able to see the sky. She often regretted the limitations of urban policy that did not allow for the breadth of spaces such as she considered fair, timely, and necessary.

She died 11 February 2000.

References

External links
Building complex in Can Mercador in Badalona co-designed by Brender in the 1960s
Apartments in Costa Brava, Gerona by Brender (page 40, published 1969)
 Apartment complex in El Prat de Llobregat, Barcelona, by Brender (page 48, published 1970)
 

1919 births
2000 deaths
Romanian architects
Romanian women architects
Romanian emigrants to Spain